Graser Nunatak is a nunatak which is isolated except for Hinely Nunatak  to the southeast, located  east of the Sky-Hi Nunataks in Palmer Land, Antarctica. It was named in 1987 by the Advisory Committee on Antarctic Names after William F. Graser, a United States Geological Survey (USGS) cartographer who, with John A. Hinely, formed the USGS satellite surveying team at South Pole Station, winter party 1976.

References

Nunataks of Palmer Land